The 1986 Virginia Slims of Kansas was a women's tennis tournament played on indoor hard courts at the Crestview Country Club in Wichita, Kansas in the United States and was part of the Category 1+ tier of the 1985 Virginia Slims World Championship Series. It was the sixth edition of the tournament and ran from January 20 through January 26, 1986. Unseeded Wendy White won the singles title and earned $12,000 first-prize money.

Finals

Singles
 Wendy White defeated  Betsy Nagelsen 6–1, 6–7(5–7), 6–2
 It was White's only singles title of her career.

Doubles
 Kathy Jordan /  Candy Reynolds defeated  JoAnne Russell /  Anne Smith 	6–3, 6–7(5–7), 6–3

References

External links
 ITF tournament edition details
 Tournament draws

Virginia Slims of Kansas
Virginia Slims of Kansas
Virgin
Virgin
Virginia Slims of Kansas